The 2009–10 Wake Forest Demon Deacons women's basketball team will represent Wake Forest University in the 2009–2010 NCAA Division I basketball season. The team will be coached by Mike Petersen. The Demon Deacons are a member of the Atlantic Coast Conference and will attempt to win an NCAA championship.

Offseason
June 23: Jessie Cain traveled to Nicaragua with twelve other Wake Forest students as part of a study abroad experience that combines health care, communication and service.
July 2: Candice Jackson has been named assistant coach for the Wake Forest women's basketball team. She will specialize in work with the Demon Deacon guards in addition to assisting in recruiting efforts.

Exhibition

Regular season

Roster

Schedule
The Demon Deacons will compete in the San Diego State Tournament from December 28–29.

ACC tournament

Player stats

Postseason

NCAA tournament

Awards and honors

Team players drafted into the WNBA

See also
2009–10 ACC women's basketball season
2009–10 NCAA Division I women's basketball season
List of Atlantic Coast Conference women's basketball regular season champions
List of Atlantic Coast Conference women's basketball tournament champions

References

Wake Forest
Wake Forest Demon Deacons women's basketball seasons